Taco Ludigman (elected about 819) was the legendary second potestaat (or magistrate governor) of Friesland. There are no contemporary sources for his true historicity, nor are there any coins or other archaeological evidence.

Taco or Focko Ludigman was potestaat of Friesland in the final part of the reign of Louis the Pious. He succeeded Magnus Forteman as potestaat. During the Lotharingian control he was succeeded by Adelbrik Adelen, of Sexbierum.

References
 Wopke Eekhoff Beknopte geschiedenis van Friesland, in hoofdtrekken: bevattende een overzigt 1851 p 490 
Jan Baptiste Christyn Les délices des Pays-Bas, ou Description géographique et historique des XVII provinces belgiques. 1769 
Staatkundige historie van Holland, Benevens de Maandelijksche Nederlandsche Mercurius 1756 p 153 Google books 
or Umich

Dutch politicians
Potestaats of Friesland